Leslie Alfred Redgrave (1882 – 15 May 1956), was an Australian writer, grazier and headmaster. He was often published as L A Redgrave and as an educator was known as L Alfred Redgrave, B.A. Redgrave was best known for his 1913 novel Gwen: a romance of Australian station life.

Birth and education
Redgrave was born in Newtown in Sydney, the son of Charles Alfred Hurst Redgrave and Mary Jane (née Bellingham). He attended Newington College (1899–1902) as a day-boy whilst his parents resided in Paddington. In 1900, and again in 1901, he passed the Junior Examination and in 1902 he was appointed as a Prefect at Newington. In March 1902 he passed the Matriculation Examination and went up to the University of Sydney. Redgrave graduated as a Bachelor of Arts three years later in 1905.

Highfield College
From 1907 until 1915, Redgrave was the proprietor and headmaster of Highfield College at Turramurra. The school was at 51 Ku-ring-gai Avenue and his brother, Wilfred Harold Redgrave, ran the junior school. Advertising for the school said:(a) An ideal home for young boys, with a mother's care, and best of food, and every comfort.(b) Primary and secondary education, with the individual attention of graduate masters.(c) Specially equipped classrooms, dormitories, and playing fields, in a fine healthy climate. On its closure in 1915 the building was demolished and redeveloped with a new home in 1917.

Marriage and children
In 1911 he married Ruby Ella Bird at St Leonards. The union produced two sons, Geoffrey Alfred (born 1912) and Ronald Leslie (born 1913).

Later life
From 1923 until 1943 Redgrave lived at Bellingara, 109 Copeland Road Beecroft. He then moved to Oura via Wagga Wagga, New South Wales, and he died in Wagga in 1956.

Publications
 Gwen: a romance of Australian Station life (1913)
 Feathered favourites: a booklet of bird verse (1932)
 Scatch Cock: a booklet of the bright birds of our bushland pictured in colour and rhyme for children (1933)
 Little bungalows: a practical handbook for the homemaker (1937)

References 

1882 births
1956 deaths
20th-century Australian novelists
Australian male novelists
20th-century Australian non-fiction writers
Writers from Sydney
People educated at Newington College
20th-century Australian male writers